Leane Zugsmith (18 January 1903 – 13 October 1969) was an American writer.

Biography
Zugsmith was born in Louisville, Kentucky on 18 January 1903 to Albert Zugsmith and Gertrude Appel. She lived in New York City, where she became a leftist journalist, proletarian writer and activist. She and playwright Carl Randau formed a salon, where she entertained guests such as Lillian Hellman, Dashiell Hammett, Heywood Broun, and Louis Kronenberger. She married Randau in 1940. She later moved to small-town New England.

She wrote novels and short stories. Her novel All Victories Are Alike is about a disillusioned newspaper columnist. The Summer Soldier is about a civil rights committee that investigates allegations of violence against workers in a southern town.

American Naturalist writer Theodore Dreiser had a copy of Never Enough in his library.

Her younger brother, Albert Zugsmith, was an American film producer, film director and screenwriter who specialized in low-budget exploitation films through the 1950s and 1960s.

Bibliography
All Victories Are Alike (1929)
Goodbye and Tomorrow (1931)
Never Enough: A Novel (1932)
The Reckoning (1934)
A Time to Remember (1936)
Home is Where You Hang Your Childhood and Other Stories (1937)
L is for labor: A glossary of labor terms (1937)
The Summer Soldier (1938)
Hard times with easy payments: Fifteen short stories from "P M " (1941)
The Setting Sun of Japan (1942, with husband Carl Randau)
The Visitor (1946, with husband Carl Randau)

References

1903 births
1969 deaths
20th-century American novelists
American women short story writers
American women novelists
Jewish American novelists
Writers from Louisville, Kentucky
Writers from New York City
20th-century American women writers
20th-century American short story writers
Novelists from New York (state)
Novelists from Kentucky
Kentucky women writers
20th-century American Jews